Shushk (also Romanized as Shūshk; also known as Qal‘eh Sūsak and Shūshak) is a village in Zirkuh Rural District, Central District, Zirkuh County, South Khorasan Province, Iran. At the 2006 census, its population was 49, in 14 families.

References 

Populated places in Zirkuh County